Annika Becker (born 12 November 1981) is a retired German pole vaulter.

Becker was born in Rotenburg an der Fulda. Her personal best is 4.77 metres, achieved in July 2002 in Wattenscheid. This was the German national record until 12 July 2011.

Achievements

See also
 Germany all-time top lists - Pole vault

External links 
 

1981 births
Living people
People from Rotenburg an der Fulda
Sportspeople from Kassel (region)
German female pole vaulters
World Athletics Championships medalists